is a fictional character from the Tekken fighting game series released by Namco Bandai Games. A fighter of Aboriginal Australian nationality, Marduk was introduced in Tekken 4 and has returned for all subsequent releases, though only available in Tekken 7 as a DLC character. Marduk started out as a villain until becoming a redeemed villain at the end Tekken 5, as well as the tag-team partner of King.

Appearances

In video games
Craig Marduk was an Australian undefeated Vale Tudo fighter for four years, but when he was involved in a minor scandal, his sponsors were glad to release him. He had been living around the world in such countries like New Zealand, Japan, Thailand, and Brazil before eventually expatriating to the United States. He was imprisoned in Arizona for accidentally killing someone during a bar fight. Marduk was suddenly released thanks to an anonymous benefactor. Upon his release he received a mysterious package containing a newspaper clipping regarding The King of Iron Fist Tournament 4 and an airline ticket. The man that Marduk killed in the bar brawl was Armor King, and Armor King's protégé, King, was the one who paid for Marduk's release, wanting him to enter the tournament in order to find him and exact revenge for killing his mentor. The two met at the tournament, where King sufficiently defeated him, leaving Marduk hospitalized. Later, King paid a visit to Marduk in the hospital to finish him off, but instead spared him after noticing a photograph showing Marduk and his family beside Marduk's bed. Enraged over his loss, Marduk began training harder than he ever had before, and managed to turn his body into the ultimate weapon. Wearing Armor King's black jaguar mask, Marduk entered a Vale Tudo tournament and challenged King after emerging undefeated. Upon the announcement of the King of Iron Fist Tournament 5, Marduk entered, knowing King would be there, he hoped to even the score. The two fought in The King of Iron Fist Tournament 5, but victory and defeat eluded both fighters, and, in defeat, they found friendship. While returning to the waiting room, Marduk was attacked. Catching only a glimpse of the attacker's back as he fled, Marduk could have sworn he looked exactly like the man he was convicted of killing, Armor King. Determined to learn the assailant's true identity, Marduk set out with King to participate in the King of Iron Fist Tournament 6. Marduk is later seen digging up Armor King's grave when Armor King shows up behind him, Marduk asks him who he is and suddenly King shows, they question him and he replies that he is "Armor King, nothing more nothing less." Marduk finds this situation crazy as he killed him with his own hands. The other Armor King reveals that he is original Armor King's brother and Marduk killed him, he then says he will never forgive him. They fight with both ending up in hospital and King enters The King of Iron Fist Tournament 7 in order to pay for their hospital bills. As Marduk recovers first during that tournament, he was about to finish an unconscious younger Armor King, until King stops him by reminding his redemption by King, likely because King had deja vu back in the end of Tekken 4, and thus was suggested by him to write a challenge letter themed retirement match to Armor King once he is recovered, if Marduk wins, the young Armor King must surrender his mask out of shame, unless Armor King won to finally put Marduk to retire from fighting, as the black masked wrestler accepts.

Marduk also appears in Tekken Tag Tournament 2 and Tekken 3D: Prime Edition. He also appears in Capcom-made crossover fighting game Street Fighter X Tekken, with King as his official tag partner. His Swap Costume is modeled after Hugo, the character from Final Fight. It gives Marduk Hugo's hair, as well as Hugo's lower part of clothes with chains. According to the download blurb, while teaming up with Hugo, Marduk decided a slight wardrobe change was in order.

In other media
Marduk appears in Tekken Comic (2009). A dossier on Marduk is briefly seen in the CGI film Tekken: Blood Vengeance when Anna Williams opens a file containing dossiers on various persons of interest.

Character design
He wears green and purple shorts with logos on them, green kneepads with name on them, and purple and green gloves. He also has purple and green necklace and mixed-coloured tattoo on his arm, although from Tekken 5 and onwards the tattoo becomes black. His Player 2 costume is representative of an Aborigine consisting of a dark brown vest with logos on them, brown leather trousers, brown shoes, and black shoulder-length hair. In later games, he no longer has hair and gains black gloves and sunglasses. Marduk is believed to be loosely based on pro wrestler Nathan Jones and MMA fighter Bob Sapp. His injured left ear is believed to be a reference to the Evander Holyfield vs. Mike Tyson II fight where Tyson bit Holyfield's ear. Marduk's name may be a reference to Craig Kukuk, the first North American native to receive a black belt in Brazilian Jiu-Jitsu, awarded to him by Royler Gracie.

Gameplay and fighting style
Marduk fights using Vale Tudo. On top of that he has background as a bodybuilder and strength athlete. Despite this he also has a technical side, having a long wrestling and grappling background and also a black belt in Brazilian jiu-jitsu. Still he prefers utilizing strength and brawling. He is a character with strong moves, great throws and a unique Mount grapple, Marduk is a powerful fighter built around a high-risk, high-damage strategy. He has a strong and unique stance, which offers a number of good tackles and attacks. For a such huge fighter he moves like he was a welterweight fighter. Furthermore, his counter-hits are really good, and often provide crushing and/or launching properties. He has some moves taken from the Japanese mixed martial artist Kazushi Sakuraba. Like Mongolian Chop from the mount position, jumping stomp, etc. Marduk is the only character who uses a knee for a low kick.

Reception

In 2009 GameSpy names Marduk as one of the "25 Extremely Rough Brawlers" in video gaming, commenting "Believe it or not, a piledriver is far more spine shattering when the person delivering it is a mean SOB." GameDaily ranked Marduk as the "21st top baldie", adding "Our boy Craig has hair everywhere but on his head." In 2013, Complex ranked Marduk as the 20th best Tekken character, commenting "At 8 feet tall, with a chest like a beer keg, Marduk is a man's man – a hairy, barroom brawler. The angry Aussie killed the first Armor King, and although he's recently made peace with King II, it's difficult to see how that can last. Marduk is graceless, plodding, and brutal – he's pure fun to play. " PlayStation Universe included Marduk and Armor King II among the top 5 rival pairs in Tekken Tag Tournament 2, commenting "Between the two, this Tag Team boasts a fine array of great throws, mid-low attacks and some fantastic juggles, making them one of the best power-based combinations around." GamingBolt included his likeness to Bill Goldberg in their list "25 Celebrities That Shockingly Resemble Video Game Characters." In GamesRadar article for Street Fighter X Tekken, they stated "An angry soul that hails from Australia and is trained in Vale Tudo, Craig Marduk has quite a lot of blood on his hands from killing opponents in fights, and that includes King II's mentor Armor King." WhatCulture named Marduk as one of the "10 major characters that may not be returning to Tekken 7", adding "he’s not a character from one of the original games, and he’s also not so popular any more." Peter Austin from WhatCulture named Marduk the "11th Greatest Tekken Character of All Time". In the official poll by Namco, Marduk is currently ranked as the 36th most requested Tekken character to be playable in Tekken X Street Fighter, at 4.15% of votes.

See also
List of Tekken characters

References

Fictional Australian people in video games
Fictional Brazilian jiu-jitsu practitioners
Fictional martial artists in video games
Fictional wrestlers
Fictional murderers
Fictional Vale Tudo practitioners
Male characters in video games
Tekken characters
Video game characters based on real people
Video game characters introduced in 2001